The 2016 College Basketball Invitational (CBI) was a single-elimination tournament of 16 National Collegiate Athletic Association (NCAA) Division I teams that did not participate in the NCAA Tournament or the NIT. The opening games and the quarterfinals were held in mid-March on the home courts of participating teams. After the quarterfinals, the bracket was reseeded for the semifinals. A best-of-three championship series was held between the two finalist teams. An experimental rule allowing players six personal fouls instead of five was used in all national postseason tournaments except for the NCAA Tournament.

Participants
The following teams were announced as participants Sunday, March 13 after the NCAA Selection Show.

Schedule
Source:
{| class="wikitable" style="font-size: 95%; text-align:center"
! Date
! Time*
! Matchup
! Television
! Score
! Attendance
|-
! colspan=6 | First round
|-
| March 15
| 7:00pm
| Morehead State at Siena
|  
| 84–80
| 2,061
|-
| March 16
| 7:00pm
| Albany at Ohio
|  
| 90–94OT
| 3,034
|-
| March 16
| 7:00pm
| Nebraska–Omaha at Duquesne
|
| 112–120
| 609
|-
| March 16
| 7:00pm
| Houston Baptist at UNC Greensboro
| ESPN3 
| 65–69
| 1,031
|-
| March 16
| 7:00pm
| Western Carolina at Vermont
|  
| 74–79
| 1,486
|-
| March 16
| 9:00pm
| Pepperdine at Eastern Washington
|  
| 72–79
| 1,518
|-
| March 16
| 10:00pm
| Idaho at Seattle
|  
| 63–68
| 999
|-
| March 16
| 10:30pm
| Montana at Nevada
|  
| 75–79
| 4,524
|-
! colspan=6 | Quarterfinals
|-
| March 21
| 7:00pm
| Duquesne at Morehead State
| 
| 72–82
| 1,387
|-
| March 21
| 7:00pm
| UNC Greensboro at Ohio
|
| 67–72
| 3,567
|-
| March 21
| 10:00pm
| Eastern Washington at Nevada|
| 70–85
| 6,053
|-
| March 21
| 10:00pm
| Vermont at Seattle 
|
| 73–54
| 999
|-
! colspan=6 | Semifinals
|-
| March 23
| 7:00pm
| Morehead State at Ohio 
|
| 77–72
| 3,712
|-
| March 23
| 10:00pm
| Vermont at Nevada|  
| 72–86
| 6,133
|-
! colspan=6 | Finals
|-
| March 28
| 8:30pm
| Nevada at Morehead State| Rowspan=3 | ESPNU
| 83–86
| 4,187
|-
| March 30
| 9:00pm
| Morehead State at Nevada| 68–77
| 7,431
|-
| April 1
| 9:00pm
| Morehead State at Nevada'| 82–85OT
| 9,043
|-
| colspan=6|*All times are listed as Eastern Daylight Time (UTC-4). Winning team in bold.
|}

BracketHome teams listed first.''
* Denotes overtime period.

References

College Basketball Invitational
College Basketball Invitational